Raymond Arthur Gripper (born 7 July 1938) is a former cricketer. He was a right-handed opening batsman and became a regular member of the Rhodesian side for 15 years starting in 1957–58, at one stage captaining them. His highest score was an innings of 279 not out made against Orange Free State in 1967–68. This remained a Currie Cup record for some years. His son Trevor played Test cricket for Zimbabwe, also as an opening batsman.

Personal life

Gripper was born on 7 July 1938, in Salisbury, Southern Rhodesia. He worked as a farmer, before turning his attention towards cricket. He has one son, Trevor Gripper, who has played test and ODI cricket for Zimbabwe.

Cricket career

Gripper made his debut for the Rhodesian cricket team in the 1957–58 season, playing 83 first class games in the Currie Cup for the territory between 1957–58 and 1971–72. He had an unbroken run playing for the team for eight years between 1958 and 1966, when he was dropped for a game against Transvaal. He later managed to get back into the team however, and he scored his best score of 279 not out against Orange Free State in the 1967–68 season. This score was a Currie Cup record for many years. Gripper also occasionally bowled some right-arm medium pace, taking 3 wickets at an average of forty runs apiece in his first class career. He toured England with the South African Fezela XI in 1961.

Administrator

Following his retirement as a cricketer in the 1971–72 season citing "business pressures", Gripper became involved in the administrative side of Rhodesian, and later Zimbabwean cricket. Gripper continued to be a leading administrator within the game until the situation within Zimbabwe Cricket began to deteriorate during the Zimbabwean cricket crisis, whereupon he resigned from the board. Gripper then became a prominent critic of the direction in which cricket was heading in Zimbabwe, notably accusing Zimbabwe Cricket chairman Peter Chingoka of corruption over payments he received "for service to cricket for 21 years", as well as criticising the structure of Zimbabwe Cricket which had stripped the players and provincial associations of voting power, thus making it impossible to remove Chingoka. He also described the managing board of Zimbabwe Cricket as a group of "money-grabbers only in the game for what they can get out of it".

Gripper has also been accused by some of being involved in the players strike that crippled the country's national team during the Zimbabwe Cricket Crisis. Gripper was approached by ZCU chairman Ozias Bvute in an attempt to negotiate a compromise deal with the rebel players.

References

1938 births
Cricketers from Harare
Zimbabwean cricketers
Rhodesia cricketers
Living people